Edmund Theodore Murray (16 August 1877 – 16 February 1969) was  Archdeacon of Cheltenham from 1943 to 1951.
 
Murray was educated at Uppingham School and Christ's College, Cambridge, and ordained after a period of study at  Leeds Clergy School in 1900. He served curacies at Bedale, Wymondham and Wem. He was Rector of Bourton-on-the-Hill from  1906 to  1946; during which time he was a Chaplain to the Forces from 1917 to 1919. He was appointed an Honorary Canon of Gloucester Cathedral in 1938.

References

1877 births
1969 deaths
People from Northumberland
People educated at Uppingham School
Alumni of Christ's College, Cambridge
Archdeacons of Cheltenham